Expo Park/USC station is an at-grade light rail station on the E Line of the Los Angeles Metro Rail system. The station is located in the center median of Exposition Boulevard near entrances to Exposition Park (Expo Park) and the University of Southern California (USC), after which the station is named. The 37th Street/USC station for the J Line of the Los Angeles Metro Busway system is located a few blocks east of the station.

The station is located close to several major museums and sporting venues including the Banc of California Stadium, the California Science Center and the Los Angeles Memorial Coliseum. During the 2028 Summer Olympics, the station will serve spectators traveling to and from venues inside Expo Park including opening/closing ceremonies along with track and field events at the Coliseum and football (soccer) matches at the Banc of California Stadium.

History

Pacific Electric stop 
Originally a stop on the Los Angeles and Independence and Pacific Electric railroads, it closed on September 30, 1953, with closure of the Santa Monica Air Line and remained out of service until re-opening on Saturday, April 28, 2012. It was completely rebuilt for the opening of the Expo Line from little more than a station stop marker. Regular scheduled service resumed Monday, April 30, 2012.

It is the last former station stop of the Santa Monica Air Line to be re-opened. The E line travels north on a new right-of-way along Flower street from this stop. The original Air line right-of-way remains owned by Metro and continues east to the A line tracks, however no plans are in place for its use.

Modern light rail station 
Expo Park/USC Station (originally proposed as "USC/Exposition Park") was proposed by Metro staff, with input from the public, during the Environmental Impact Report (EIR) process. Many stakeholders cited the importance of the station, citing the convenient access it would provide the USC students/employees and Exposition Park guests. Moreover, the station would be crucial for a temporary professional football venue at the current Los Angeles Memorial Coliseum, the soccer-specific Banc of California Stadium that replaced the Los Angeles Memorial Sports Arena, as well as for the 2028 Summer Olympics.

The administration of USC opposed at-grade light-rail along Exposition Boulevard, claiming that light-rail would separate the campus from Exposition Park. USC President Steven Sample, in particular, was opposed to the project. Sample said he feared the line would create physical and psychological barriers between USC, Exposition Park, and the local community, and would be dangerous for pedestrians.

However, the general sentiment of students and neighbors was in support of the line. The Coliseum Commission took a strong position in support of this station, and the USC Student Senate passed a resolution in support of the station. In the end, Metro staff included the possibility of building the Expo Park/USC station by including it as a design option in the Final EIR, that would only be built if funds for the station (estimated at $5 million) could be found and if local support were present. The report also recommended a short tunnel segment under the impacted intersections of Exposition/Figueroa and Exposition/Flower.

Once the FEIR had been approved, the Exposition Metro Line Construction Authority worked to secure the funds for this station and to negotiate its design. One other issue remaining to be resolved was USC's request for special architecture for the three stations serving the campus.

Ultimately, USC did not contribute toward the cost of the station. The Authority also abandoned any considerations for special architecture requested by USC. On September 19, 2007, the Metro board approved funding for the cost of the station, which had increased to $7 million. This allowed the station to be built along with the rest of Phase 1.

Service

Station layout 

The station's platforms slope down slightly toward the east, in order to accommodate the line's descent into a tunnel which passes under Figueroa Street.

Hours and frequency

Connections 
, the following connections are available:
 LADOT Commuter Express: 438*, 448*
 LADOT DASH: F, King-East, Southeast
 Los Angeles Metro Busway: : 910, 950 (at )
 OC Bus (Orange County): 701*, 721*
 Torrance Transit: 4X*
Note: * indicates commuter service that operates only during weekday rush hours.

Notable places nearby 
The station is within walking distance of the following notable places:
 Banc of California Stadium (home of Los Angeles FC) 
 California African American Museum
 California Science Center
 Exposition Park
 Exposition Park Rose Garden
 Los Angeles Memorial Coliseum (home of USC Trojans Football)
 Natural History Museum of Los Angeles County
 University of Southern California

Station artwork 
The station's art was created by artist Robbert Flick. The installation, entitled "On Saturdays", includes sequences of photographs taken on the boulevards near the station, creating a document of the local people and places as they were when the station was built.

References 

E Line (Los Angeles Metro) stations
Railway stations in Los Angeles
Railway stations in the United States opened in 2012
Exposition Park (Los Angeles neighborhood)
Exposition Park (Los Angeles)
University of Southern California
2012 establishments in California
Railway stations in California at university and college campuses
Pacific Electric stations